Enrique López Pérez (born 3 June 1991) is a Spanish professional tennis player playing on the ATP Challenger Tour. On 16 July 2018, he reached his highest ATP singles ranking of 154 and his highest doubles ranking of 135 was achieved on 15 April 2019.

López Pérez was provisionally suspended by the Tennis Integrity Unit in December 2019, later receiving an eight-year ban from the sport for match-fixing in three separate instances in 2017.

Challenger and Futures Finals

Singles: 38 (26–12)

Doubles: 62 (31–31)

References

External links

See also
Match fixing in tennis
Tennis Integrity Unit

1991 births
Living people
Spanish male tennis players
Match fixing in tennis
Tennis players from Madrid